The 2002–03 season was U.S. Città di Palermo's second season in a row in Serie B. In addition to the domestic league, Palermo participated in this season's edition of the Coppa Italia.

Players and statistics

|-
!colspan=14 style=background:pink; text-align:center|Goalkeepers
|-

|-
!colspan=14 style=background:pink; text-align:center|Defenders
|-

|-
!colspan=14 style=background:pink; text-align:center|Midfielders

|-
!colspan=14 style=background:pink; text-align:center|Forwards

|}

Competitions

Overview

Serie B

League table

Matches

Source: Formazioni Palermo

Coppa Italia

Group 8 table

Matches

 
Source: La Coppa Italia

Notes

References

Palermo F.C. seasons
Palermo